Abdul Rahman Al-Ghassani (born 8 July 1990), commonly known as Abdul Rahman Al-Ghassani, is an Omani footballer who plays for Fanja SC in Oman Professional League.

References

External links

Abdul Rahman Al-Ghassani - GOALZZ.com
Abdul Rahman Al-Ghassani - KOOORA

1990 births
Living people
People from Al-Rustaq
Omani footballers
Oman international footballers
Association football forwards
Fanja SC players
Oman Professional League players